Tattnall may refer to:

People:
Edward Fenwick Tattnall (1788–1832), American politician, soldier and lawyer
Josiah Tattnall (disambiguation), multiple people

Georgia:
Tattnall County, Georgia, county located in the U.S. state of Georgia
Tattnall Square Academy, independent, non-profit, Christian, college preparatory academy in Macon, Georgia
The Tattnall Journal, the oldest weekly newspaper serving Tattnall County, Georgia

United States Navy:
  or Wickes-class destroyer (DD-75 to DD-185), a group of 111 destroyers built by the United States Navy in 1917–1919
 , Wickes-class destroyer in the United States Navy during the World War I
 , Charles F. Adams-class guided missile-armed destroyer of the United States Navy

See also
Tattenhall
Tatton Hall
Tettenhall
Tutnall